Chileseius is a genus of mites in the Phytoseiidae family.

Species
 Chileseius camposi Gonzalez & Schuster, 1962
 Chileseius paracamposi Yoshida-Shaul & Chant, 1991

References

Phytoseiidae